The women's long jump event  at the 1991 IAAF World Indoor Championships was held on 8 and 9 March.

Medalists

Results

Qualification

Final

References

Long
Long jump at the World Athletics Indoor Championships
1991 in women's athletics